"Lay Your Hands" is the first single released from Blue band member Simon Webbe's debut solo album, Sanctuary. The single peaked at  4 on the UK Singles Chart, No. 2 in Italy, and No. 9 in Spain.

Track listings
UK and European CD single
 "Lay Your Hands" – 4:29
 "Me, Myself and I" – 3:48

UK DVD single
 "Lay Your Hands" (video)
 "Lay Your Hands" (Stargate remix photo gallery)
 "Lay Your Hands" (Stargate instrumental—behind the scenes at the photo shoot, Italy, 5 May)

European maxi-CD single
 "Lay Your Hands"
 "Me, Myself and I"
 "Lay Your Hands" (Stargate remix)
 "Lay Your Hands" (video)

Charts

Weekly charts

Year-end charts

Certifications and sales

References

2005 songs
2005 debut singles
Innocent Records singles
Simon Webbe songs
Songs written by Simon Webbe
Songs written by Matt Prime
Songs written by Tim Woodcock
Virgin Records singles